Shadow Dragon is a project to develop a hypersonic spaceplane for China.

See also
 Supersonic transport

References

Spaceplanes
Proposed aircraft of China